Amaná National Forest is a national forest in the state of Pará, Brazil. Most of it has been allocated for use in sustainable forestry or community forestry. Mining is allowed.

Location

The Amaná National Forest is in the Amazon biome.
It was created by decree on 13 February 2006 and is administered by the Chico Mendes Institute for Biodiversity Conservation (ICMBio).
It covers parts of the municipalities of Jacareacanga and Itaituba in the state of Pará.
The forest is in the south west of the state of Pará along the border with the state of Amazonas, between the Madeira River and the Tapajós.
To the west it adjoins the  Urupadi National Forest in Amazonas, a sustainable use conservation unit created in 2016.

Usage

The Amaná National Forest is classed as IUCN protected area category VI (protected area with sustainable use of natural resources) with the objective of sustainable multiple use of forest resources, maintenance and protection of water resources and biodiversity, and supporting sustainable exploitation of natural resources.
Mining is allowed in the forest following the provisions of its management plan.
The management plan defined six land usage zones, as follows:

The 2009 annual plan authorized the grant of five forestry units totalling .

Regional conservation

The national forest was created as part of the planning process for land management and environment protection along the BR-163 trans-Amazon highway.
It is in a region that contains 12 sustainable use conservation areas and 6 fully protected areas.
The fully protected areas, which cover , are the Amazônia, Jamanxim, Rio Novo and Serra do Pardo national parks, the Nascentes da Serra do Cachimbo Biological Reserve and the Terra do Meio Ecological Station.

Notes

Sources

2006 establishments in Brazil
National forests of Brazil
Protected areas of Pará